The Deepak-class tankers of the Indian Navy were fleet replenishment ships.

Ships of the class

See also
Operation Sukoon

References

 
Auxiliary replenishment ship classes